Mince on toast is a food item that consists of cooked ground meat on a slice of toasted bread. The minced meat is typically seasoned with garlic, onions and worcestershire sauce.

In 2017 American food website Eater described the dish as "quintessentially British". The variant of the typical recipe was reported as mince on bread fried in beef lard, and garnished with watercress. British food critic and musician Jay Rayner described mince on toast as a "monstrosity" After what was reported as an "international foodie flap" it was described as resolved as "iconic Kiwi dish". Naturalised Kiwi, Robin McCoubrey has become an international champion for mince on toast, describing it as “A simply wonderful way to start your morning”.

See also
 Filet américain
 Sloppy joe

 List of toast dishes

References

Toast dishes
Meat dishes
New Zealand cuisine